Aspidodiadema sinuosum is a species of sea urchin of the family Aspidodiadematidae. Their armour is covered with spines. It is placed in the genus Aspidodiadema and lives in the sea. Aspidodiadema sinuosum was first scientifically described in 1981 by Mironov.

See also 
 Aspidodiadema montanum
 Aspidodiadema nicobaricum
 Aspidodiadema tonsum

References 

sinuosum
Animals described in 1981